Adraskan (Pashto: ادرسکن) is a historical town in western Afghanistan near the Harut River. 

It was mentioned in 13th and 14th century geographies as one of four prominent towns in the district of Sabzwar, the Green Place, which, now called Shindand (Pashto equivalent of Sabzwar). Now the town is the center of Adraskan District in Herat Province, Afghanistan. The main Kandahar–Herat Highway passes through the town.

During the Soviet–Afghan War, the 68th Guards Separate Engineer Battalion, 5th Guards Motor Rifle Division, 40th Army, appears to have been located here.

Climate
With an influence from the local steppe climate, Adraskan features a cold semi-arid climate (BSk) under the Köppen climate classification. The average temperature in Adraskan is 14.2 °C, while the annual precipitation averages 216 mm.

July is the hottest month of the year with an average temperature of 26.6 °C. The coldest month January has an average temperature of 1.7 °C.

See also
 Herat Province

References

Populated places in Herat Province